Elizabeth Phelps may refer to:

 Elizabeth Stuart Phelps Ward (1844–1911), early feminist American author and intellectual
 Elizabeth Porter Phelps (1747–1817), diarist from Hadley, Massachusetts
 Elizabeth Wooster Stuart Phelps (1815–1852), American writer
 Elizabeth Phelps (20th century), American fashion designer and co-founder of Phelps Associates
 Elizabeth A. Phelps, professor of neuroscience